Potterspury is a populous village and civil parish in West Northamptonshire. The nearest main town is Milton Keynes, the centre of which is about 7 miles south-east. At the time of the 2011 census, the parish's population (including Furtho) was 1,453 people.

The village's name is a concatenation. It was originally cognate with Perry and sometimes written as such, implying pear tree or orchard. Several places are named such regionally. The helpful (disambiguatory) prefix 'Potters', seen by the 15th century, is a nod to the very old, important potteries here.
An alternative is "Estpury", seen in 1452.

Geography
Potterspury is on the A5 road, formerly the Roman road of Watling Street between Towcester six miles to the north and Stony Stratford a mile to the south. The village sits at the edge of Whittlewood Forest, a relatively large ancient woodland to the west that was part of the original estate of the Duke of Grafton. Much of this is an SSSI, recognising its biodiversity and providing strong protection against built environment encroachment. Parts are open to the public in the Spring but most footpaths and bridleways adjoin the area, some linking into the Chiltern Hills (Chilterns).

Stony Stratford and Towcester have nearby substantial shopping areas. 

Nearby villages comprise Wicken, Deanshanger, Grafton Regis, Alderton and Yardley Gobion.

Landmarks
The parish church, with medieval elements, is dedicated to Saint Nicholas. Its foundations date to at least 1087 when it (implying its rectory, its main church lands) was granted by Robert de Ferrers, 1st Earl of Derby to Bernard the Scribe.  The Queen's Oak which stood nearby until 1997 was reputed to be the site of the first meeting between Edward IV and his queen Elizabeth Woodville.

Facilities
The high street has is a small grocery/stationery shop with post office and a village hall. 

The village pubs The Talbot on the A5 and The Cock on the High Street. There is a sports and social club at Meadow View, the ground of Potterspury Football Club. 

A spa is, quite centrally placed, on Poundfield Road, named Cloud 9, adjoining Potterspury House Restaurant.

Education

Educational provision in the village includes the specialist education needs school Potterspury Lodge School, which helps children with learning difficulties, and John Hellins Primary School. Most leavers go on to Elizabeth Woodville School, formerly Kingsbrook School, in Deanshanger, as their secondary school. John Hellins was a mathematician and astronomer who, as parish priest at Potterspury, founded and taught in the village school.

Notes and references

Notes

References

External links

Village website
John Hellins Primary School website.
 
Cloud 9 Spa
Potterspury House Restaurant

Villages in Northamptonshire
West Northamptonshire District
Civil parishes in Northamptonshire